Begonia consobrina is a species of plant in the family Begoniaceae. It is endemic to Ecuador.  Its natural habitats are subtropical or tropical moist lowland forests and subtropical or tropical moist montane forests. It is threatened by habitat loss.

References

consobrina
Endemic flora of Ecuador
Near threatened plants
Taxonomy articles created by Polbot